The Embassy of the Republic of Indonesia in Wellington is the diplomatic mission of the Republic of Indonesia to New Zealand, which is also concurrently accredited to the Independent State of Samoa and Kingdom of Tonga. The embassy is located at 70 Glen Road in the Wellington suburb of Kelburn.

Diplomatic relations between Indonesia and New Zealand started in 1958, which then it was accredited to Australia. It was not until 1973 that Sutikno Lukitodisastro was appointed as the first Indonesian ambassador to New Zealand. The current ambassador, Fientje Maritje Suebu, was appointed by President Joko Widodo on 12 January 2022.

See also 
 Indonesia–New Zealand relations
 List of diplomatic missions of Indonesia
 List of diplomatic missions in New Zealand

References

External links 

 

Indonesia–New Zealand relations
Wellington
Indonesia